The 2011 NCAA Rifle Championships were contested at the 32nd annual NCAA-sanctioned competition to determine the team and individual national champions of co-ed collegiate rifle shooting in the United States. 

The championships were held at the United States Army Marksmanship Unit at Fort Benning in Columbus, Georgia and hosted by nearby Columbus State University.

Kentucky won the team championship, the Wildcats' first NCAA national title in rifle.

Qualification
With only one national collegiate championship for rifle shooting, all NCAA rifle programs (whether from Division I, Division II, or Division III) were eligible. A total of eight teams contested this championship.

Results
Scoring:  The championship consisted of 60 shots for both smallbore and air rifle per team.

Team title
(DC) = Defending champions
Italics = Inaugural championship
† = Team won center shot tiebreaker

Individual events

References

NCAA Rifle Championship
NCAA Rifle Championships
2011 in shooting sports
NCAA Rifle Championships